Halle is the 13th album and 10th studio album by Casiopea released in 1985.

Track listing

Personnel
CASIOPEA are
Issei Noro - Electric guitar (YAMAHA SG-1, SG-3000 Fretless), Chorus, Percussion
Minoru Mukaiya - Keyboards (YAMAHA DX-7, KX-88, TX-816, EMULATOR-II, Acoustic Piano) 
Tetsuo Sakurai - Electric Bass (YAMAHA Tetsuo model, BB-5000, BB-3000 Fretless)
Akira Jimbo - Drums (YAMAHA YD-9000RG & RD, Zildjian cymbals, Simmons SDS-5), Percussion

Production
Producer - Issei Noro
Co-Produced by Shunsuke Miyazumi

Recording & Re-mix engineer: Kohji Sugimoto
Assistant Engineers: Hiroyuki "Jax" Shimura, Hironobu Asano

Designer: Toshinao Tsukui
Photographer: Koichi Inakoshi
Remastering engineer - Kouji Suzuki (2016)

Release history

External links

References

1985 albums
Casiopea albums
Alfa Records albums